Hello, Love, Goodbye is a 2019 Filipino romantic drama film produced and distributed by Star Cinema. Directed by Cathy Garcia-Molina and produced by Carlo L. Katigbak and Olivia M. Lamasan, it stars Kathryn Bernardo and Alden Richards, with several cast members includes Kakai Bautista, Lito Pimentel, Joross Gamboa, Maymay Entrata, Lovely Abella and Jameson Blake. The film follows when a struggling overseas Filipino worker, and a bartender, as they attempt to reconcile their personal careers and love for each other in Hong Kong.

Hello, Love, Goodbye is currently the highest grossing Philippine film of all time. It won several accolades, including Box Office Entertainment and PMPC Star awards. The film was released on July 31, 2019, in the Philippines and started screening internationally on August 1, 2019.

Synopsis 
Joy (Kathryn Bernardo) is a spunky, down-on-her-luck millennial who works as a domestic helper in Hong Kong. While she excels in her job and enjoys the friendship of many other empowered domestic helpers, she plans to leave the city soon.

In her journey to achieving her goals, Joy meets Filipino bartender Ethan (Alden Richards). Ethan is already building a permanent life in Hong Kong. In a few years, he will officially become a resident in the city. After escaping responsibilities all his life, Ethan now wants to commit to a career and to his family (who also reside in Hong Kong). Joy and Ethan soon develop a friendship. The two become each other's joy against the grime and grind of Hong Kong.

Cast

Main 

 Kathryn Bernardo as Joy Marie Fabregas:  A nursing graduate who works as a domestic helper in Hong Kong. 
 Alden Richards as Ethan Del Rosario:  A bartender who is on his way of attaining Hong Kong residency status who is relatively well off compared to Joy.

Supporting 
 Kakai Bautista as Sally Daraga
 Lito Pimentel as Mario Del Rosario
 Joross Gamboa as Jihim
 Maymay Entrata as Mary Dale Fabregas
 Lovely Abella as Gina Marikit
 Jameson Blake as Edward Del Rosario
 William Lorenzo as Celso Fabregas
 Anthony Jennings as Eric Del Rosario
 Wilbert Ross as Joey Fabregas
 Aliyah Billote as Liezel Fabregas
 Angela Poliquit as Annie
 Jon Go as Wayne
 Poon Po Lun Lilac as Lin (Annie's mother)
 Pang Mei Sheung as PoPo (Mrs. Chung)

Special Participation 
 Maricel Laxa as Lita
 Maxine Medina as Tanya
 Jerome Ponce as JM

Production
The film is starred by Kathryn Bernardo and Alden Richards. Both are affiliated with the two major rival networks in the Philippines: Bernardo with ABS-CBN and Richards with GMA Network. The two also belongs to two different "love teams": Bernardo with Daniel Padilla in Kathniel and Richards with Maine Mendoza in AlDub. Together, they play the role of two Overseas Filipino Workers (OFWs) in Hong Kong who became romantically involved with each other. Director Cathy Garcia-Molina said that the two main cast members were not subjected to "baby or special treatment" for the film project.

Filming for Hello, Love, Goodbye in Hong Kong has begun by April 2019, amidst the early period of the 2019–20 Hong Kong protests, and was completed after a month. Principal photography for the film ended by May 19, 2019, in Sucat, Parañaque. Post-production work for Hello, Love, Goodbye was done in Bangkok, Thailand, with ABS-CBN Film Productions collaborating with Thai production firm Kantana Group. It was the first collaboration between the two firms.

Release

Theatrical run
Hello, Love, Goodbye premiered in the Philippines on July 31, 2019 in 465 cinemas, a record. The international screenings started on August 1, 2019. The film also made history in Saudi Arabia as the first Filipino film ever to be screened in the cinemas of Jeddah.

Reception

Box office
The film was declared the highest-grossing Filipino film of all time after earning over  worldwide gross revenue on September 3, 2019, replacing the film The Hows of Us that was also directed by Molina and starred by Bernardo.

Domestic
Three days after its local release, the film was reported to have earned . After four days, the film earned  and was shown in 465 cinemas nationwide. As of August 12, 2019, the film has grossed  domestically in 13 days of showing. After 17 days in cinemas, the film has grossed  domestically.

International
The film earned  in box office receipts abroad on its first week of release.

Critical response
Filipino film critic Philbert Dy gave the film a rating of 4 out of 5 and praised Bernardo's performance. Oggs Cruz, writing for Rappler, reviewed the film thus, "Hello, Love, Goodbye is fine entertainment – one that doesn’t dumb down the issues it puts forward for the sake of a standard happy ending." He pointed out that while the romantic plot was formulaic and characters seemed to have become stereotypical, the film's strengths were its depiction of Hong Kong through the female protagonist's perspective and of the struggles of overseas Filipino workers as domestic helpers. In his review, Armando B. Chavez of Philippine Daily Inquirer said that the love story stood out due to the "backdrop of the plight of OFWs in Hong Kong." He also praised the musical editing, the close-up shots of the protagonists, and performances of Bernardo and Richards, describing them as tour de force. He wrote, "This is a date movie if ever there’s one. As they say back home, “just feel the feeling.” Sit back, secretly dab the tears away... resistance is futile."

Ricky Lo of The Philippine Star gave a generally positive review of the film particularly the comic relief provided by Abella, Bautista, and Entrata. Tito Genova Valiente however disagreed and considered the trio's performances as "aggravating" while praising Bernardo and Richard, stating, "There is Bernardo with perhaps the quietest performance for any actress of her generation. Bernardo can act within a small frame, holding her face solidly as if a slight movement will mar that portrayal... Alden gets the cinematographic love, as well. His Ethan starts fun and ends tragic but with lots of hope, even if it does not matter what happens to that hope. When those tears fall from Richards's eyes, they bring us back to those old, old cinemas of leading men looking beautiful and strong in grief."

Accolades

Possible sequel
On August 1, 2019, during the opening week of the film, lead actor Alden Richards and director Cathy Garcia-Molina expressed openness on working on a sequel for the film despite the latter's confirming plans to retire from directing to focus on her family. On August 26, 2019, lead actress Kathryn Bernardo has also expressed similar sentiments on doing a sequel for the film.

Novel adaptation
A novel adaptation written of Hello, Love, Goodbye, authored by Palanca awardee Charmaine Lasar and published under ABS-CBN Books, was released on August 26, 2019. The novel also include additional narration on the backstory of Joy, about her life in the Philippines prior to moving to Hong Kong and an epilogue which was not depicted in the film. Behind-the-scenes information, and on-set photos are also included in the novel.

Notes

References

External links 
 

2019 films
Star Cinema films
Films about bartenders
Films shot in Hong Kong
Films set in Hong Kong
Filipino-language films
2010s Tagalog-language films
2019 romantic drama films
Philippine romantic drama films